Socola may refer to:
Socola, a quarter in the Romanian city of Iași
the Socola Monastery, part of the Iași quarter
Socola, a village in Vadul-Rașcov Commune, Șoldănești district, Moldova